Pamela "Pam" Hyatt (born April 9, 1936) is a Canadian actress who played Noble Heart Horse in 1986's The Care Bears Movie II: A New Generation and the voice of Kaede in the English version of Inuyasha, guest-starred in USA Network's The Dead Zone and voiced Campe and Atropos in Class of the Titans.

In 2012, Hyatt released her debut album Pamalot! with Peter Hill on piano.

Hyatt is the mother of Carson T. Foster and Zack Ward.

Partial filmography

Only God Knows (1974) - Waitress
Circle of Two (1981) - Mrs. Smyth
Care Bears Movie II: A New Generation (1986) - Noble Heart Horse (voice)
Police Academy 3: Back in Training (1986) - Sarah's Mother
Killer Party (1986) - Mrs. Henshaw
And Then There was One (1994, TV Movie) - Roxy's mom
Ultimate Betrayal (1994, TV Movie) - Older Helen Rodgers
The Neverending Story (1995, TV Series) - Morla (voice)
Ace Ventura, Pet Detective (1995, TV Series) - Atrocia Odora (voice)
Holiday Affair (1996, TV Movie) - Emily Chambers
The Legend of Gator Face (1996) - Mayor's Wife
Infinite Ryvius (2000, TV Series) - Captain of the Dicastia (English version, voice)
Kill Me Later (2001) - Lucy
Replicant (2001) - Mrs. Riley
Inuyasha the Movie: Affections Touching Across Time (2001) - Kaede (English version, voice)
Pecola (2001, TV Series) - (voice)
The Telescope (2002, Short) - Grandmother
Hamtaro (2002) - Auntie Viv (voice)
Yakkity Yak (2002, TV Series) - Granny Yak (voice)
Inuyasha - Kagami no naka no mugenjou (2002) - Kaede (English version, voice)
Jacob Two-Two (2003, TV Series) - (voice)
Silverwing (2003, TV Mini-Series) - Frieda / Wolf / Flying Squirrel (voice)
Master Keaton (2003) - Mrs. Murata (voice)
Inuyasha: The Secret of the Cursed Mask (2004, Video Game) - Kaede (English version, voice)
Barbie as the Princess and the Pauper (2004) - Madame Carp (voice)
Dragon Drive (2004, TV Series) - Ensui (voice)
Polly Pocket 2: Cool at the Pocket Plaza (2005, Video short) - Miss Throckmorton (voice)
Scary Movie 4 (2006)
Barbie: Mermaidia (2006) - Mirror Fish (voice)
The Future is Wild (2007, TV Series) - (voice)
Barbie in a Christmas Carol (2008) - Aunt Marie (voice)
The Story of Luke (2012) - Susan
Christmas Song (2012, TV Movie) - Estelle Barlow
Twelve Trees of Christmas (2013, TV Series) - Mrs. O'Hanlon
Numb Chucks (2014, TV Series) - (voice)
Restoration (2016) - Linda
Mrs. Krantz Bakes Great Cookies (2016) - Jane Deville
The Christmas Cure (2017, TV Movie) Mrs. Willis
Magic Madeleines (2018)
Baroness Von Sketch Show (2018, TV Series) -Widow (1 episode)
Christmas Movie Magic (2021, TV Movie) - Debbie

References

External links

1936 births
Living people
Actresses from New York (state)
American emigrants to Canada
Canadian film actresses
Canadian television actresses
Canadian voice actresses
People from Garden City, New York
20th-century Canadian actresses
21st-century Canadian actresses